Miyana is a mixed-use residential and commercial development of Gigante Grupo Mobiliario in Nuevo Polanco district of Mexico City. US$400 million).

There are three residential towers which will eventually have over 800 apartments.

Commercial anchors of the shopping center include Cinépolis VIP, Office Depot, Petco, Soriana hypermarket, The Home Store, Toks restaurant and a food court, "Food Central" with 15 vendors.

References

Buildings and structures in Mexico City
Miguel Hidalgo, Mexico City
Mixed-use developments in Mexico
Shopping malls in Greater Mexico City